Eden is a processed filled cheese food (labeled as "processed filled cheese spread") brand owned by Mondelēz International. It was first launched in the Philippines by Kraft Foods (predecessor of Mondelēz International) in 1981.

Varieties
 Eden Original
 Eden Singles
 Eden Melt Sarap (quick-melt cheese food)
 Eden Queso de Bola Flavor (available during Christmas season)

Other Eden products
 Eden Mayo
 Eden Sandwich Spread

References

External links
Official website

Mondelez International brands
Food brands of the Philippines
Processed cheese
Products introduced in 1981